Grand Prairie Township is one of eighteen townships in Platte County, Nebraska, United States. The population was 333 at the 2020 census. A 2021 estimate placed the township's population at 329.

History
Grand Prairie Township was originally called Stearns Township, and under the latter name was established in 1872. It was renamed Grand Prairie in 1874.

See also
County government in Nebraska

References

External links
City-Data.com

Townships in Platte County, Nebraska
Townships in Nebraska